Pusong Ligaw (International title: Lost Hearts / ) is a 2017 Philippine melodrama television series starring Beauty Gonzalez, Bianca King, Sofia Andres, Diego Loyzaga, Enzo Pineda, Joem Bascon and Raymond Bagatsing. The series premiered on ABS-CBN's Kapamilya Gold afternoon block, replacing The Greatest Love in The Better Half's timeslot, and worldwide via The Filipino Channel from April 24, 2017, to January 12, 2018, and was replaced by Asintado.

Plot
Pusong Ligaw is a classic story about friendship, love, and dreams. Two women, Tessa and Marga are bound by a promise to keep their friendship forever. This fictional drama follows them through the disintegration of their friendship, the tragedy in their lives and their children's, and their reconciliation.

They both come from poor families but Tessa and Marga always support each other as they face their issues, struggles, challenges, as well as the happy experiences of their youth. Their bond is tested when Caloy enters their lives. Caloy has a historical relationship with Marga, but she prefers to keep it platonic. He meets Tessa and they fall in love. Marga changes her mind about Caloy and decides she can win him back. As Tessa pursues her dream of becoming a fashion designer, Caloy gets jealous of Tessa's mentor, the wealthy and influential Jaime Laurel, owner of a fashion conglomerate in Asia and America, who invites Tessa to one of his events. Marga uses Caloy's jealousy to undermine his faith in Tessa, and in one drunken evening, they spend the night together.

Tessa finds them together the next morning and is distraught. Shattered and broken over the betrayal of both friends, she leaves Caloy and returns to her home in the province. She discovers she is pregnant and her mother banishes her from their home. Tessa moves to Manila alone and supports herself. She gives birth to a boy, Rafael, and struggles to earn a living as a seamstress in Divisoria. Her life further destructs when her baby is kidnapped by a woman known by authorities for kidnapping and selling babies. Unable to find her son, Tessa is distraught and out of her mind when Jaime Laurel finds her and takes care of her. Years later, they get married. Although Tessa never stops looking for her son, she adopts a street urchin and calls him Rafa.

Caloy is heartbroken over losing Tessa. He returns to school and completes his engineering degree. He leaves to work abroad with an international shipping company, saving a substantial amount of money when he returns. He opens a business servicing companies and retail establishments requiring mechanical repairs of tools and mechanical equipment.  He does very well, and is able to build a large house, and continues to support orphans with building their job skills to keep them off the streets.

Marga becomes a successful entrepreneur, her talent agency becomes one of the biggest in the Philippines. She runs into Caloy and the two resume their friendship and eventually become a couple.

Tessa goes on to fulfill her dream to become a fashion designer, and with the help of Jaime, she opens a fashion couture house in the US called House of Teri. They return to Manila when Jaime feels Tessa is ready to launch her ready-to-wear brand in the Philippine market.

The lives of the three friends collide at the House of Teri launch. But instead of renewing old friendship and forgiving past mistakes, they thread down a path of jealousy, revenge, and obsession: this time including Jaime Laurel, the one person most affected by their history.

At the near end of the series, it is revealed that Jaime was responsible for murdering his foster son Rafa and a master manipulator of the events so far. Tessa and Caloy discover the DNA results revealing Miraculo Policarpio as their biological son Rafael M. Cervantes, and Jaime manipulates Tessa for blaming her real son for the crime he did not commit. He stages a car accident while he was sought by the authorities and barely survives the car crash. Due to his mental instability, he kidnaps Marga's son as a bait to get Tessa, which succeeds until the arrival of Caloy, Marga, and the authorities to rescue them. Eventually, to pay back what Marga has done to her best friend, she sacrifices herself to rescue Tessa from getting shot by Jaime until he was neutralized by the authorities.

After Marga's death due to not surviving at the hospital from her gunshot wounds by Jaime, Leon serves life imprisonment for working with Jaime to plan Rafa's murder. Jaime is sent to the mental asylum after surviving the gunshot wound by the authorities. Tessa becomes the owner and entrepreneur of House of Teri (now renamed House of Tessa) where she shows a tribute of the fashion models wearing the dress designs made by the late Marga, as their dreams from their youth have finally come true, all while being supported by Caloy, Potpot, and Vida.

Cast and characters

Main cast
 Beauty Gonzalez as Teresa "Teri / Tessa" Magbanua-Laurel / Tessa Magbanua Cervantes
 Bianca King as Margarette "Marga" Dimaawa-Verdadero  
 Sofia Andres as Vida D. Verdadero 
 Diego Loyzaga as Rafael M. Cervantes / Miraculo "Potpot M. Cervantes 
 Enzo Pineda as Rafael "Rafa" M. Laurel
 Joem Bascon as Carlito "Caloy" Cervantes 
 Raymond Bagatsing as Jaime Laurel

Supporting cast
 Albie Casiño as Leon M. Laurel
 Atoy Co as Danilo "Danny" Magbanua
 Smokey Manaloto as Melchor Policarpio
 Almira Muhlach as Didith Policarpio
 Maureen Mauricio as Rowena Magbanua
 Shalala Reyes as Asiong "Tita Asya" Salonga
 Vangie Labalan as Gabriella "Lolay" Policarpio
 Beverly Salviejo as Guadalupe "Guada" Epifania
 Rhed Bustamante as Melanie "Melai" Policarpio
 Ysabel Ortega as Charlotte "Charlie" Quiñones
 Maricar de Mesa as Amanda Yulo
 Helga Krapf as Patrice
 Carla Humphries as Lauren

Guest cast
 IC Mendoza as Vinny
 Jojit Lorenzo as Lito
 Tart Carlos as Noemi
 Air Lajada as Arvin
 Marnie Lapuz as Luz
 Emman Nimedez as Tisoy
 Ricci Chan as Alex
 Hiyasmin Neri as Andrea
 Trina "Hopia" Legaspi as Kitty
 Michael Rivero 
 Erin Ocampo as Cynthia
 Luis Hontiveros as Lance
 Benedict Campos as Sandro
 John Matthew Uy as Mike
 Chienna Filomeno as Shane
 Nikki Gonzales
 Igi Boy Flores
 Dawn Chang as Janine
 Franchesca Floirendo
 Marinella Sevidal 
 Angelo Alayon as JR
 Josef Elizalde
 Ethyl Osorio
 Wilmer Abulencia as Buknoy
 Alex Calleja
 Jong Cuenco as Father Julian
 Cora Waddell as Kayla
 Lilygem Yulores
 Chun Sa Jung
 Clint Bondad as Simon
 Manuel Chua as Marcus
 Eslove Briones
 Alchris Galura

Special participation
 Teresa Loyzaga as Olivia Montero
 Alma Moreno as Alma Morena
 Miriam Quiambao as Monique de la Cuesta-Laurel
 Nikka Valencia as Clarissa Dimaawa
 Justin Cuyugan as Emil Verdadero
 Loren Burgos as Ximena Vergara
 Vivo Ouano as Edward Jacobs
 Troy Montero as Chris Ruiz
 Nina Ricci Alagao as Donna Bella
 Johnny Revilla as Paul Enriquez
 Toby Alejar as Donato Antonio
 Marco Gumabao as Nathan Ruiz

Ratings

Production
Timeslot changes

Following The Greatest Love's conclusion, the show became Kapamilya Gold's leadoff teleserye, and ABS-CBN decided to move The Better Half to 4:15 PM which was previously occupied by Pusong Ligaw's predecessor.

See also
List of programs broadcast by ABS-CBN
List of drama series of ABS-CBN
Kadenang Ginto

References

External links
 
 

ABS-CBN drama series
Philippine melodrama television series
Philippine romance television series
Philippine thriller television series
2017 Philippine television series debuts
2018 Philippine television series endings
Television series by Star Creatives
Fashion-themed television series
Filipino-language television shows
Television shows filmed in the Philippines